Marijampolė (also known by several other names) is a cultural and industrial city and the capital of the Marijampolė County in the south of Lithuania, bordering Poland and Russian Kaliningrad Oblast, and Lake Vištytis. The population of Marijampolė is 48,700 (2003). It is the Lithuanian center of the Suvalkija region.

Marijampolė is the seventh-largest city in Lithuania, and has been its regional center since 1994. The Šešupė River divides the city into two parts which are connected by six bridges.

Names
The city has also been known as Marijampolis, Mariampol, Starapole, Pašešupiai, Marjampol, Mariyampole, and Kapsukas (1955–1989).

History
The settlement was founded as a village called "Pašešupė", after the nearby river of Šešupė. As such the town was first mentioned in 1667. In the 18th century the village, at that time belonging to the Catholic Church, grew to become a market town and its name was changed to Starpol or "Staropole", after a new village built for Prienai starost's guards in the vicinity in 1739. The settlement was destroyed by a fire in 1765.

After the disaster the wife of contemporary starost of Prienai, Franciska Butler née Ščiuka, financed a new church and a monastery for the Congregation of Marian Fathers. Following the foundation of the monastery, a new town was built in the area. It was named "Maryampol", after the Blessed Virgin Mary (Marya-), with the Greek suffix -pol denoting a town.

On 23 February 1792 King of Poland and Grand Duke of Lithuania Stanisław II Augustus granted the "townlet of Mariampol" with Magdeburg Law and a privilege of market organisation. Following the Partitions of Poland the town was briefly part of Prussia. However, after the Napoleonic Wars it was transferred to Congress Poland ("Russian Poland"). In the 19th century the town continued to grow, mostly thanks to a large number of Jewish and German settlers. In 1817 the town became the seat of a separate powiat within the administrative system of the kingdom. In 1827 the town had 1759 inhabitants. By 1861 the number had grown to 3718, 3015 of them being Jewish. A fire consumed many wooden homes in 1868. As a result, many houses were rebuilt of stone.

Following the January Uprising and the Russian suppression of the former Commonwealth lands, the powiat of Maryampol was seriously diminished. Around that time also the monastery gained prominence as it was the only monastery owned by the Marians that was not closed down by the tsarist authorities. As the surroundings of the town were primarily inhabited by Lithuanians, the town became the centre of the Lithuanian national revival. The proximity of the Prussian border made the smuggling of books in Lithuanian language, banned in Imperial Russia, easier. Among the most notable Lithuanian scholars and writers active in Mariampol at that time were Kazys Grinius, Jonas Jablonskis and Vincas Kudirka.

Following World War I the town became part of Lithuania and was renamed to its current name Marijampolė.

During World War II Marijampolė was occupied by the Soviet Union. During 1940–1941 Soviet authorities deported several hundred inhabitants of Marijampolė. In 1941 Nazi Germany occupied the town. On 1 September 1941, between 5,000 and 8,000 Jews from Marijampolė, Kalvarija and elsewhere, along with people from other backgrounds, were murdered. Their bodies were placed in mass graves near the Šešupė River. Most of the murderers were Lithuanian. In the effect of the war the town was heavily damaged and almost emptied. On July 31, 1944 Soviet army once again entered the city. The following year its counter-intelligence SMERSH repressed about 500 people from Marijampolė. During the first years of Soviet occupation in 1944–1953  Soviet deportations from Lithuania to Siberian gulags numbered somewhere between 5,000 and 6,000 Lithuanians from Marijampolė county. In late post war years the city was rebuilt and repopulated with inhabitants from other parts of Lithuania. Currently in Marijampolė roughly 98% of its inhabitants are Lithuanians.

On 9 April 1955 communist authorities of the Lithuanian SSR renamed the town "Kapsukas" after a Lithuanian communist politician Vincas Mickevičius-Kapsukas. The old name was restored in 1989. In 1990 Lithuania regained independence.

Marijampolė has been the administrative centre of the county since 1994. In 2018, in the 100th anniversary of the restoration of the independence of Lithuania, the city of Marijampolė became the cultural capital of Lithuania.

The Anshe Sholom B'nai Israel synagogue in Chicago was founded by immigrants from Marijampolė. Other Jewish migrants from Marijampolė settled in Manchester and Leeds.

Transport
Marijampolė is accessible by railway, Kaunas-Šeštokai-Alytus line. Marijampolė is located at the crossroads of two highways. The Via Baltica connects Helsinki with Central and Southern Europe. The other highway links the city of Kaliningrad with Minsk.

Industry and economy

Marijampolė is connected to its partners by business, sport, education, tourism, and other ties. Marijampolė's local means of mass media include a local television station, a local radio station, the newspapers "Marijampolės laikraštis", "Suvalkietis", "TV savaitė", "Sugrįžimai", and magazine "Suvalkija". Culturally, Marijampolė enjoys one cinema and a municipal drama theater.

Marijampolė is a regional centre of light industry enterprises, construction, transport and trade. It has also become home to one of the largest second-hand car markets in Europe.

Education

Marijampolė has a strong educational system with state education institutions: 9 pre-school institutions, 6 nursery schools, 1 primary school, 12 lower secondary schools, 9 secondary schools, 4 gymnasium, a youth school, an adult education center, 5 additional training establishments, 3 non-state education institutions, a music school of Christian Culture, gymnasium of Marijonai, and R.Vosylienė languages school.

Marijampolė Municipality

Marijampolė has a City Council with 27 members. The members of the City Council represent different Lithuanian political parties.

The Marijampolė Municipality is adjacent to the Vilkaviškis District Municipality in the west, Kazlų Rūda Municipality in the north, Kalvarija Municipality in the south, and the Prienai District Municipality and Alytus District Municipality in the east.

The town of Marijampolė and its six surrounding communities make up the territory of Marijampolė Municipality. They are: Gudeliai, Igliauka, Liudvinavas, Marijampolė, Sasnava, and Šunskai communities.

Twin towns — sister cities

Marijampolė is twinned with:

 Bergisch Gladbach, Germany
 Kokkola, Finland
 Kvam, Norway
 Lesja, Norway
 Mayo County, Ireland
 Piotrków Trybunalski, Poland
 Reșița, Romania
 Rogozno, Poland
 Suwałki, Poland
 Valga, Estonia
 Valka, Latvia
 Viborg, Denmark

Notable people
 Ovidijus Vyšniauskas, a Lithuanian musician. The first Lithuania representer at Eurovision Song Contest in 1994.
 Violeta Urmana, opera singer, an honorary citizen of the city
 Moshe Rosenthalis (1922–2008), Lithuanian-Israeli painter
 Witold Teofil Staniszkis, Polish politician
 AGE, rock and blues band
 Elada Eimaitė, motivational speaker & writer
 Darius Songaila, basketball player
 Ugnė Siparė, TV presenter
 Petronėlė Vosyliūtė-Dauguvietienė, theatre actress
 Sharune, actress
 Albina Simokaitytė, theatre actress
 Saulius Brusokas, male weightlifter and strongman competitor

 Sue Perkins, British comedienne; great grandmother from Mariampolė

Gallery

Notes and references

External links

 Homepage of the city
 History of the Jewish shtetl in Marijampolė
 Organ at Basilica of Marijampolė

 
Cities in Marijampolė County
Capitals of Lithuanian counties
Cities in Lithuania
Municipalities administrative centres of Lithuania
Suwałki Governorate
Shtetls
Holocaust locations in Lithuania